This is a list of women's football clubs in Turkey.

As of the 2021–22 Season:

See also
 List of football clubs in Turkey
 Turkish Women's First Football League
 Women's football in Turkey

References

 
Turkey women
Women's